The communauté de communes Vierzon Pays des cinq Rivières was located in the Cher département of the Centre  region of France. It was created in November 2002. It was merged into the new Communauté de communes Vierzon-Sologne-Berry in January 2013.

It comprised the following 3 communes:

Vierzon
Méry-sur-Cher
Thénioux

References 

Vierzon Pays des cinq Rivieres